, or Zuiryusan Nanzen-ji, formerly , is a Zen Buddhist temple in Kyoto, Japan. Emperor Kameyama established it in 1291 on the site of his previous detached palace. It is also the headquarters of the Nanzen-ji branch of Rinzai Zen. The precincts of Nanzen-ji are a nationally designated Historic Site and the Hōjō gardens a Place of Scenic Beauty. The temple was destroyed in a fire in 1895 and rebuilt in 1909.

History
Nanzen-ji was founded in the middle Kamakura period (1291, or Shōō 4 in the Japanese era system).  It was destroyed by fire in 1393, 1447, and 1467, rebuilt in 1597, and expanded in the Edo era. A large complex, it has varied over time between nine and twelve sub-temples.

Zenkei Shibayama, who provided a popular commentary on the Mumonkan, was an abbot of the monastery.

Significance in Zen Buddhism 
The head temple presiding over the Gozan in Kyoto is Nanzen-ji. After the completion of Shōkoku-ji by Ashikaga Yoshimitsu in 1386, a new ranking system was created with Nanzen-ji at the top and in a class of its own. Nanzen-ji had the title of "First Temple of The Land" and played a supervising role.

Notable structures

Sanmon 

The temple's Sanmon gate was originally constructed in the 13th century, destroyed in 1369 at the order of the government, and reconstructed in 1628. The gate contains stairs to an elevated viewing area, which was the setting for a famous scene in the 1778 Kabuki play Sanmon Gosan no Kiri inspired by the story of the criminal Ishikawa Goemon who is said to have spoken of the beauty of the view (but who was executed prior to the construction of the current gate).

Hōjō 
The hōjō (abbot's quarters) of Nanzen-ji is notable both for its gardens and its art.

The garden of the hōjō is considered one of the most significant examples of karesansuigardens (rock gardens), and was built in the 1600s by Kobori Enshu. The garden mirrors natural forms, and is seventy percent gravel. It has been designated a national Place of Scenic Beauty.

The hōjō itself, also known as the Seiryo-den, was given to the temple by the Emperor Go-Yōzei. It contains a variety of important screen paintings on gold backgrounds, including two of tigers by Kanō Tan'yū. It has been designated a National Treasure.

Nanzen-ji Aqueduct 
Constructed in 1890 through the temple grounds to carry irrigation water from the Lake Biwa Canal.

Gallery

See also 
Ishikawa Goemon
 List of Buddhist temples in Kyoto
List of National Treasures of Japan (temples)
List of National Treasures of Japan (ancient documents)
 For an explanation of terms concerning Japanese Buddhism, Japanese Buddhist art, and Japanese Buddhist temple architecture, see the Glossary of Japanese Buddhism.

References

Further reading

External links 
 
  Kyoto Prefectural Tourism Guide:  Nanzen-ji
  Joint Council for Japanese Rinzai and Obaku Zen:  Nanzen-ji
 Sacred Destinations:  Nanzen-ji, Kyoto;
 Buddhist Travel:  Nanzen-ji
Wheelchair Accessibility of Nanzenji

1291 establishments in Asia
Buddhist temples in Kyoto
National Treasures of Japan
Nanzen-ji temples
 
Places of Scenic Beauty
Historic Sites of Japan
Important Cultural Properties of Japan
1290s establishments in Japan